The Falcon and the Pod is the debut and only studio album by American industrial band aTelecine. It was released on August 9, 2011, by Pendu Sound Recordings.

Track listing

References

2011 debut albums
ATelecine albums